Verna Frances Bloom (August 7, 1938 – January 9, 2019) was an American actress.

Career 
On Broadway, Bloom portrayed Charlotte Corday in The Persecution and Assassination of Jean-Paul Marat as Performed by the Inmates of the Asylum of Charenton Under the Direction of the Marquis de Sade (1967) and Blanche Morton in Brighton Beach Memoirs (1983). She made her film debut in Medium Cool, and then co-starred in Clint Eastwood's 1973 film, High Plains Drifter and in the 1974 made-for-TV movie Where Have All The People Gone? with Peter Graves and Kathleen Quinlan. Bloom also had roles in more than 30 films and television episodes beginning the 1960s, including playing Mary, mother of Jesus, in The Last Temptation of Christ in 1988 and Marion Wormer in Animal House in 1978.

Personal life and death
Bloom was born in Lynn, Massachusetts, and attended the School of Fine Arts at Boston University, graduating with a BFA in 1959. She also studied at the HB Studio in New York City.

Bloom married Richard Collier, but they separated by 1969. They began the Trident Theater in Denver Colorado, which operated from 1963 to 1965. In 1972 she married film critic Jay Cocks. They had a son, Sam, born in 1981. The couple remained married until her death.

Bloom died aged 80 on January 9, 2019, in Bar Harbor, Maine, from complications of dementia.

Filmography

Film

Television

References

External links
 
 
 
 

1938 births
2019 deaths
Actresses from Massachusetts
American film actresses
Jewish American actresses
Actors from Lynn, Massachusetts
Boston University College of Fine Arts alumni
20th-century American actresses
21st-century American actresses
American stage actresses
21st-century American Jews